DG Cement is a Pakistani building materials company which is owned by Nishat Group. It is the largest cement manufacturer of Pakistan with a production capacity of 14,000 tons per day.

The company has three active plants which are present in Khairpur, Chakwal, Dera Ghazi Khan and Hub, Balochistan.

In 1992, Nishat Group acquired the company under privatization scheme.

DG Khan cement stands for Dera Ghazi Khan cement. This is due to fact that first plant was setup in southern Punjab city Dera Ghazi Khan.

History
The company was started in 1986 to cater the cement needs in Pakistan. The plant was supplied by the Ube Industries of Japan. Initially, it was state-owned company under State Cement Corporation of Pakistan providing jobs to thousands of people. The company established their first active plant in southern Punjab city Dera Ghazi Khan and therefore kick-started their production. This was first step to industrialize the Southern region of Punjab, Pakistan. Then, they established their second plant in  Khairpur, Chakwal. This increased their production capacity and became one of well performing cement companies of Pakistan.

Expansion
Pakistan has an attractive market of cement industry. In 2015, it was reported local demand for cement increase by 12% in one year and so the DG Khan cement decided to increase their capacity. Pakistani cement demands are increasing with time due to active construction industry. In 2015, it was reported that local demand increased drastically due to Pakistan-China Economic Corridor. With this hike in demand DG Khan setup their third and one of the largest plant of Pakistan in Hub, Balochistan which is on the edge of Pakistani metropolis Karachi. Cement manufacturing plant usually takes two to three years to complete. So, it is expected that this plant's construction will complete in 2018 making DG Khan cement largest cement manufacture of Pakistan.

Acquisition
The government-owned company was acquired by Pakistani business group Nishat Group in 1992 to expand and diversify their business.

Plants
 Hub
 Khairpur, Chakwal
 DG Khan

References

Nishat Group
Cement companies of Pakistan
Manufacturing companies established in 1986
Pakistani companies established in 1986
Pakistani brands
Manufacturing companies based in Lahore
1992 mergers and acquisitions
Companies listed on the Pakistan Stock Exchange
Formerly government-owned companies of Pakistan
Dera Ghazi Khan District